Vivek R. Shah is an American businessman and chief executive officer of Ziff Davis, an American internet and digital media company.

Education
Shah holds a B.A. in political science from Tufts University.

Career
Shah began his career in 1995 at Time Warner Inc. There, he held multiple management positions within the Fortune/Money Group and was named president of the Fortune/Money Group in 2007.

In 2010, Shah purchased technology publisher Ziff Davis, in partnership with private equity firm Great Hill Partners. With the purchase, he became CEO of Ziff Davis. He remained with Ziff Davis following its purchase by J2 Global in 2012. Shah was appointed CEO of J2 Global, effective January 1, 2018. In 2021, following J2 Global’s name change to Ziff Davis, Shah became the CEO of Ziff Davis, Inc., effective October 7, 2021.

In 2006, Shah was named to Crain's New York Business' 40 Under 40. In 2011, FOLIO: Magazine named Shah to its FOLIO: 40. Shah was also named Online Publisher of the Year by MinOnline and Innovator of the Year by BtoB's Media Business, and has been inducted into MinOnline's Digital Hall of Fame.

In 2014, Shah was named Chairman of the Interactive Advertising Bureau (IAB).

References

Living people
21st-century American businesspeople
Businesspeople from New York City
American media executives
American businesspeople in the online media industry
American chief executives
Year of birth missing (living people)